Hemiconus scabriculus is an extinct species of sea snail, a marine gastropod mollusk, in the family Conidae, the cone snails and their allies.

Distribution
Fossils of this marine species were found in Eocene strata in United Kingdom.

References

 Solander, D. C. "Descriptiones specierum." Brander G., Fossilia Hantoniensia collecta, et in Musaeo Brittannico deposita a Gustavo Brander (1766): 9-43.
 Tracey S., Craig B., Belliard L. & Gain O. (2017). One, four or forty species? - early Conidae (Mollusca, Gastropoda) that led to a radiation and biodiversity peak in the late Lutetian Eocene of the Cotentin, NW France. Carnets de Voyages Paléontologiques dans le Bassin Anglo-Parisien. 3: 1-38

External links
 Kohn, Alan J. "Type Specimens and identity of the described species of Conus II. The species described by Solander, Chemnitz, Born, and Lightfoot between 1766 and 1786." Journal of the Linnean Society of London, Zoology 45.304 (1964): 151-167

scabriculus
Gastropods described in 1766